Paul Bloom (born December 24, 1963) is a Canadian American psychologist. He is the Brooks and Suzanne Ragen Professor Emeritus of psychology and cognitive science at Yale University and Professor of Psychology at the University of Toronto. His research explores how children and adults understand the physical and social world, with special focus on language, morality, religion, fiction, and art.

Early life and education 

Bloom was born into a Jewish family in Montreal, Quebec. As an undergraduate he attended McGill University, where he earned a Bachelor of Arts in psychology (with honors first class) in 1985. He attended graduate school at the Massachusetts Institute of Technology, where he earned a PhD in cognitive psychology in 1990, under the supervision of Susan Carey.

As a rationalist and a self-declared atheist, he rejects all notions of spirits, deities, and the afterlife.

Career 
From 1990 to 1999, he taught psychology and cognitive science at the University of Arizona. Since 1999, he has been a professor of psychology and cognitive science at Yale University.

Since 2003, Bloom has served as co-editor in chief of the scholarly journal Behavioral and Brain Sciences.

He joined the Department of Psychology at the University of Toronto in 2021.

Honors and awards 
Bloom has held the Harris Visiting Professorship at the Harris Center for Developmental Studies at the University of Chicago (2002); the Nijmegen Lectureship at the Max Planck Institute at the University of Nijmegen (2006); the Templeton Lectureship at Johns Hopkins University (2007-8); and the Visiting Distinguished SAGE Fellowship at the UCSB SAGE Center for the Study of Mind (2010).

In 2002, the Society for Philosophy and Psychology awarded Bloom the Stanton Prize for outstanding early-career contributions to interdisciplinary research in philosophy and psychology, and in 2005-06, he served as the society's president. In 2006, he was made a fellow of the American Psychological Society in recognition of his "sustained outstanding contributions to the science of psychology".

In 2004, he received the Lex Hixon Prize for teaching excellence in the social sciences at Yale. In 2007, his Introduction to Psychology class was selected as an outstanding Yale course to be made available worldwide through the Open Yale Courses initiative.

In 2017, he received the $1 million 2017 Klaus J. Jacobs Research Prize for his investigations into how children develop a sense of morality.

Bibliography 
Bloom is the author of seven books and editor or co-editor of three others. His research has appeared in Nature and Science, and his popular writing has appeared in The New York Times, The Guardian, The American Scientist, Slate and The Atlantic.

His article in The Atlantic, "Is God an Accident?" was included in The Best American Science Writing 2006.   Bloom concludes that "the universal themes of religion are not learned." Taking his cues from Darwin, Bloom posits that our spiritual tendencies emerged somewhere in the evolutionary process, most likely as "accidental by-products" of other traits.

He has had regular appearances on National Public Radio and Bloggingheads.tv.

Books 
 Bloom, P. (2023). Psych: The Story of the Human Mind. Harper Collins.
 Bloom, P. (2021). The Sweet Spot: The Pleasures of Suffering and the Search for Meaning. Harper Collins.
 Bloom, P. (2016). Against Empathy: The Case for Rational Compassion. Ecco
 Bloom, P. (2013). Just Babies: The Origins of Good and Evil. The Crown Publishing Group.
 Bloom, P. (2010). How Pleasure Works: The New Science of Why We Like What We Like. New York: W. W. Norton & Co.
 Bloom, P. (2004). Descartes' Baby: How the Science of Child Development Explains What Makes Us Human. New York: Basic Books.
 Bloom, P. (2000). How Children Learn the Meanings of Words. Cambridge, Massachusetts. MIT Press.
 Jackendoff, R.; Bloom, P.; & Wynn, K. (1999). Language, Logic, and Concepts: Essays in Honor of John Macnamara. Cambridge, Massachusetts: MIT Press.
 Bloom, P.; Peterson, M.; Nadel, L.; & Garrett, M. (1996). Language and Space. Cambridge, Massachusetts: MIT Press.
 Bloom, P. (1994). Language Acquisition: Core Readings. Cambridge, Massachusetts: MIT Press.

Selected popular articles 
(March 2014). "The War on Reason", Atlantic Magazine.
(November 2013). "Politicians Really Are Big Babies".
(January 2012). "Religion, Morality, Evolution". Annual Review of Psychology, vol. 63. Religion, Morality, Evolution.
(May 2010). "The Moral Life of Babies". The New York Times Magazine.
(September 2009). "The long and short of it". The New York Times.
(August 2009). "What's Inside a Big Baby Head?" (Book Review: The Philosophical Baby by Alison Gopnik). Slate.
(June 2009). "No Smiting". (Book Review: The Evolution of God by Robert Wright). The New York Times.
(November 2008). "Does religion make you nice?". Slate.
(November 2008). "First-person Plural". Atlantic Monthly.
(June 2006). "Seduced by the flickering lights of the brain". Seed Magazine.
(December 2005). "Is God an accident?" The Atlantic Monthly.

References

External links

 Paul Bloom's personal homepage
Links to Bloom's articles and books at Yale
 Introduction to Psychology, video course by Paul Bloom at Open Yale Courses
 
 TED Talk: Paul Bloom: The origins of pleasure (TEDGlobal 2011)

1963 births
Living people
MIT School of Humanities, Arts, and Social Sciences alumni
University of Arizona faculty
Yale University faculty
American science writers
American cognitive scientists
Canadian emigrants to the United States
Canadian psychologists
Jewish American social scientists
Jewish American writers
Jewish Canadian writers
Evolutionary psychologists
Moral psychologists
Scientists from Montreal
Writers from Montreal
McGill University alumni
Developmental psycholinguists
20th-century Canadian scientists
21st-century Canadian scientists
Writers from New Haven, Connecticut
Scientists from New Haven, Connecticut
Canadian male non-fiction writers
20th-century American scientists
21st-century American scientists
21st-century American Jews